Holcocera guilandinae is a moth in the  family Blastobasidae. It is found in the United States in southern Florida and on Bermuda.

The length of the forewings is 6.1-9.2 mm. The ground color of the forewings is pale brown intermixed with brownish-orange and brown scales. The hindwing dorsal and ventral surfaces have pale-brown scales basally, gradually darkening to the apex.

The larvae feed in the stem of Caesalpina bonducella and Garberia heterophylla.

References

Moths described in 1900
guilandinae